Patrick Neufeld (born December 26, 1988) is a professional Canadian football offensive lineman for the Winnipeg Blue Bombers of the Canadian Football League (CFL). He is a two-time Grey Cup champion having won the 107th Grey Cup and 108th Grey Cups as a member of the Blue Bombers. He played college football for the Saskatchewan Huskies football team from 2008 to 2011. He played high school football at Luther College in Regina, Saskatchewan.

Professional career

Saskatchewan Roughriders
Neufeld was drafted 33rd overall by the Saskatchewan Roughriders in the 2010 CFL Draft but returned to school following the 2010 training camp. He appeared in 17 regular season games in both 2011 and 2012 for the Roughriders, but only dressed for three games in 2013 in an injury-plagued season.

Winnipeg Blue Bombers
On October 6, 2013, Neufeld was traded (along with a 5th round selection in the 2015 CFL Draft) to the Winnipeg Blue Bombers for Alex Hall and a 2nd round pick in the 2014 CFL Draft. He remained on the injured list for the duration of the 2013 season. From 2014 to 2016, he battled injuries as he only dressed for a maximum of 12 games in each of those seasons. In 2017 and 2018, he dressed in all 18 regular season games and a combined three post-season games. 

For the 2019 season, he was injured before training camp and did not play in the first 12 games of the season. He started the last six regular season games and three post-season games. Neufeld won the 107th Grey Cup when the Bombers defeated the Hamilton Tiger-Cats 33-12, a game in which he started as the right guard. After the win, he signed a one-year extension with Winnipeg to play his seventh year with the team. He signed another one-year extension with the Blue Bombers on January 19, 2021.

References

External links
Blue Bombers bio

1988 births
Living people
Canadian football offensive linemen
Players of Canadian football from Saskatchewan
Saskatchewan Huskies football players
Saskatchewan Roughriders players
Sportspeople from Regina, Saskatchewan
Winnipeg Blue Bombers players